The 1993 Cork Intermediate Hurling Championship was the 84th staging of the Cork Intermediate Hurling Championship since its establishment by the Cork County Board in 1909. The championship began on 15 May 1993 and ended on 12 September 1993.

On 12 September 1993, Youghal won the championship following a 2-13 to 3-07 defeat of Kilbrittain in the final at Páirc Uí Rinn. This was their fourth championship title overall and their first title since 1988.

Youghal's Eoin Coleman was the championship's top scorer with 2-27.

Team changes

To Championship

Promoted to the Cork Senior Hurling Championship
 Bishopstown (secured promotion but continued to participate in the Cork IHC with their second team)

To Championship

Promoted from the Cork Junior A Hurling Championship
 Aghada
 Newcestown
 Newtownshandrum

Results

First round

Second round

Quarter-finals

Semi-finals

Final

Championship statistics

Top scorers

Overall

In a single game

Miscellaneous

 The first round tie between Blackrock and Na Piarsaigh was the first championship match in any grade to be played at the newly-opened Páirc Uí Rinn.

References

Cork Intermediate Hurling Championship
Cork Intermediate Hurling Championship